Maloye Kozino is an urban locality (an urban-type settlement) in Balakhninsky District of Nizhny Novgorod Oblast, Russia. Population:

References

Urban-type settlements in Nizhny Novgorod Oblast
Balakhninsky District